Martín Fernández de Vilches (also Martín de Vilches) (born Vilches, Kingdom of Jaén, ? – Bonilla de la Sierra, died (13 November 1469), was a Roman Catholic prelate who served as Bishop of Ávila (1456–1469).

Biografia 
Of humble origins, he was born in the Kingdom of Jaén. He worked as a bureaucrat during the reign of  John II of Castile, and advanced to become counsellor for Henry IV of Castile. In 1436, he served as master of the Capella de Reyes Nuevos de la catedral de Toledo and canon de Jaén from 1449 until 1452.

After the ascent of Henry IV to the throne (1454), he was named Canceller Major de La Poridad, replacing Rodrigo de Villacorta, who was in disagreement with the monarch. In 1456, he was nominated by the king as Roman Catholic Diocese of Ávila and confirmed by Pope Paul II, vacant since the death of Alonso Tostado, where he served until his death in 1469. During the Spanish civil war against Alfonso of Castile, he was a supporter of Henry IV of Castile.

References

Bibliography 
 
 
 
 

1469 deaths
Bishops appointed by Pope Paul II
15th-century Roman Catholic bishops in Castile